Piya Ghar Aaja is an Indian film directed by Prahlad Dutt and starring Meena Kumari, Karan Dewan, Saroj, Agha Jaan and Mohantara Talpade. Meena Kumari also lent her voice for playback and sang seven songs in this film. The film was released on April 23, 1948. Incidentally, the film’s original title was "Jalan".

Plot

Karan Dewan, a medical student marries the niece (Meena Kumari) of a lawyer without the consent of their respective families. However, there is no opposition to the marriage from the respective families. After some time, complications develop in their married life due to a jealous sister-in-law (Bhabhi) who wanted Karan to marry her sister. The jealously becomes the main theme of the film with melodrama interspersed with some comical situations by Agha. At the end, everything is well settled.

Soundtrack

References

External links
 

1940s Hindi-language films
Films scored by Bulo C. Rani
Indian black-and-white films